Somkele Iyamah-Idhalama (born 23 March 1988) is a Nigerian TV and film actress and model. She is well known for her roles in 93 Days (2016), The Wedding Party, The Arbitration (2016), and the TV series Gidi Up (2013–2014) and at the Toronto International Film Festival and Africa International Film Festival. She is an ambassador for Multichoice's DSTV Explora, the widest satellite cable network across Africa. She has in the movie, A Soldier's Story 2: Return from the Dead - sequel to a 2016 multiple award-winning romantdramasama.

Iyamah was born in Ika South Area of Delta State, to Andrew and Onyi Iyamah, both are of Ika (Agbor) origin. She is the third of four children. She was introduced to dance and drama by an inspirational teacher, Mrs. Abe while attending Grange School in Lagos.

Somkele holds a bachelor's degree in biochemistry from McMaster University.  Somkele volunteered in several shows for charity at McMaster and modeled during the holidays in Nigeria. Her website states her work includes Virgin Nigeria, Harp, ETB and Visafone Communications.

Career 

Her first audition landed her a lead role. Her works for TV are in the AMVCA nominated and critically acclaimed series, ‘GIDI UP’ by NdaniTV, Amazon's ‘THE EXPAN,SE’ and CBC's ‘CORONER’. Her career in film has led her to share the screen with Nollywood's directors such as Steve Gukas and Kemi Adetiba. She also shared screen-time with Hollywood veteran, Danny Glover in the biopic, 93 DAYS where she plays one of the surviving doctors who caught Ebola in Nigeria directed by Steve Gukas which went on to win several awards and accolades. That role won her an ELOY award (best actress of the year), AMVCA nomination best-supportingting actress, an AMVCA trailblazer award win, TFAA award, an AMAA nominat,ion and an AFRIFF Jury Award. She starred alongside Hollywood veteran, Eric Roberts in the movie: A Soldier's Story 2: Return From The Dead which was released in Dec 2020.

Her corporate endorsements include Multichoice Nigeria (DSTV Ambassador), Jewel By Lisa, and The Access Bank Lagos City Marathon. She has been on the cover of GENEVIEVE Magazine and interviewed by her Alma Mater, McMaster University for their Canada @ 150 special Edition as well as CNN online. She serves as the Regional Head of the fashion brand, Andrea Iyamah.

Personal life 
Somkele manages the fashion brand, Andrea Iyamah, founded by her younger sister, Dumebi Iyamah. She is married to Captain Aaron Idhalama, a thought leader and industry professional in the Nigerian aviation sector. She has a son that had cancer and later became cancer free.

Awards and nominations

Filmography

See also
 List of Nigerian actors

References 

Living people
Actresses from Delta State
21st-century Nigerian actresses
Nigerian film actresses
Nigerian television actresses
AMVCA Trailblazer Award winners
McMaster University alumni
1987 births
Nigerian models
Nigerian female models
Africa Magic Viewers' Choice Awards winners
21st-century Nigerian businesspeople
Nigerian television personalities
21st-century Nigerian businesswomen
Nigerian film award winners